Jorge Carlos Eiras (born 25 May 1970) is an Argentine alpine skier. He competed in the men's slalom at the 1988 Winter Olympics.

References

1970 births
Living people
Argentine male alpine skiers
Olympic alpine skiers of Argentina
Alpine skiers at the 1988 Winter Olympics
Place of birth missing (living people)